Tournoi Perrier de Paris may refer to either of the following golf tournaments:

 Tournoi Perrier de Paris (Challenge Tour), a tournament on the Challenge Tour in 1993
 Tournoi Perrier de Paris (European Tour), an unofficial money tournament on the European Tour between 1994 and 1998